Absalon (c. 1128–1201) was a Danish archbishop and statesman.

Absalon may also refer to:
Absalon-class support ship, a 2004 class of ship of the Royal Danish Navy
HDMS Absalon (L16)
Absalom (name) or Absalon
Avessalom or Absalon, a Russian male given name 
Absalon, Martinique, a populated place in Martinique
Absalon, code name for a unit in Operation Gladio
Absalon (artist) (1964–1993), Israeli-French artist and sculptor
Julien Absalon (born 1980), French mountain biker

See also
Absalom (disambiguation)